Fire-Hearted is the third studio album by metal musician Elias Viljanen as solo artist. The album features Marko Hietala (ex-Nightwish, ex-Tarot, ex-Northern Kings) and Tony Kakko (Sonata Arctica, ex-Northern Kings) on vocals. Also contributing is Jari Kainulainen (Evergrey, Ex-Stratovarius) on bass, Henrik Klingenberg (Sonata Arctica) on keyboards and Mikko Sirén (Apocalyptica) on drums. The album was out in June 2009. The song "Last Breath of Love" with Marko on vocals can be heard on Elias' Myspace together with the title-track.

Track listing
all songs written by Elias Viljanen except where noted.
 "Fire-Hearted" - 04:18
 "Last Breath of Love" (Elias Viljanen, Marko Hietala) - 03:41
 featuring Marko Hietala on vocals
 "Cruel Groove" - 2:52
 "Kiss of Rain" (Elias Viljanen, Tony Kakko) - 3:53
 featuring Tony Kakko on vocals
 "Head up High" - 2:58
 "Up to Speed" - 2:29
 "Supernatural" - 4:13
 "One Tonight" - 3:53
 "The Triumph" - 3:37
 "My Guiding Light" - 3:00
 "Showstopper" - 3:51
 "Beautiful Piece" (Elias Viljanen, Jaan Wessman) - 4:04
 featuring Jaan Wessman on fretless bass guitar

Credits
Elias Viljanen - Guitars
Henrik Klingenberg - Keyboards
Jari Kainulainen - Bass guitar
Tomi Ylönen - Drums

Guests
Marko Hietala (ex-Nightwish) - Vocals (on "Last Breath of Love")
Tony Kakko (Sonata Arctica) - Vocals (on "Kiss of Rain")
Jaan Wessman - Fretless bass guitar (on "Beautiful Piece")
Mikko Sirén (Apocalyptica) - Drums (on "Supernatural", "Beautiful Piece", "Last Breath of Love", "Kiss of Rain", "Fire-Hearted" and "One Tonight")

References
 

2009 albums